is a 2005 feature film by Japanese writer/director Satoshi Miki.

Plot
Suzume Katagura (Juri Ueno) is an ordinary housewife whose spouse is sent overseas on business. She keeps regular contact by phone, but is more concerned with the welfare of his pet turtle, Taro. She dreams of being able to escape from her mundane existence one day. On one occasion, she accidentally floods her apartment, causing her to send in a plumber. Her best friend, Kujaku Ogitani (Yū Aoi) leads a much more interesting life than her and still wants more, namely a husband in Paris with a house with a view of the Eiffel Tower. Later on, while she is on some steep steps, a cart filled with apples accidentally unloads, prompting her to duck, and notice a tiny flyer advertising for spies wanted. After trying (and failing) to make her life more interesting, she replies to the advert and goes into a ramshackle home to meet the spy masters, unemployed couple Shizuo Kugitani (Ryō Iwamatsu) and Etsuko Kugitani (Eri Fuse), who work for an organization that is never referred to by name. They instruct her that her job is to remain completely boring and ordinary. She has this re-iterated to her when she buys a pair of sunglasses to make herself feel more like a spy. At one point, Suzume meets Kujaku in line for a chance to spin a wheel and win marvelous prizes (including a trip to France, hence Kujaku's excitement). While they miss out on a trip to France, they do win a fishing trip, which Suzume is more excited about than Kujaku. Suzume explains that she can never say "no" to Kujaku, because, when they were young, Kujaku cut off the power in the village so that Suzume could see her childhood sweetheart, Kato, in his pajamas, electrocuting herself in the process. The fishing trip is cut short when a body is discovered in the water. An unnamed group takes notice of the fact that the corpse did not belong to a Japanese, and was probably a spy, which starts an investigation to look for more spies. Meanwhile, Suzume meets Kato only to discover, to her horror, that he is bald. While he meets her again the next day, his son comes looking for him, takes him away, and he is never seen again. Eventually, the spies are contacted by the government of their group, who instruct them to return to their country. Suzume is told to say goodbye to all of her friends and family, as she may never see them again. However, Kujaku is missing, and the mysterious group appear outside her door. As Suzume prepares to throw her old life away (symbolized by throwing Taro the Turtle into the river), she sees Kato's son drowning in the river, and as an instinct reaction, rescues him. Witnesses report their statement to the news, and soon artist's impressions of her face appears all over the news. When the order is given for the spies to return, the mysterious group are already patrolling the streets, making escape impossible. To make sure her fellow spies can return safely, Suzume cuts the power in the same fashion that Kujaku did when they were young. When the spies all finally meet at the rendezvous point, Shizou tells Suzume that the government say it would be best for her to remain at home. An old lady on a bench (previously referred to as a "bench hag") reveals herself to be the leader of the operation, and opens a trap door beneath her bench. Suzume waves goodbye to everyone as they walk inside. Suzume then explains that Kujaku got her wish of living in France with a view of the Eiffel Tower, as she has been arrested for espionage in a prison overlooking the tower. The film ends with Suzume walking into the distance to rescue her friend.

Cast
Juri Ueno as Suzume Katakura 
Yū Aoi as Kujaku Ogitani 
Jun Kaname as Kato 
Masatō Ibu as Nakanishi
Yutaka Matsushige as Ramen Chef 
Ryō Iwamatsu as Shizuo Kugitani
Eri Fuse as Etsuko Kugitani

Reception
Emma Slawinski of Eye for Film panned the film when she wrote "(the film) is a miscellany of characters, scenes and events that studiously avoids a plot", and "There are moments of wit and the odd thoughtful comment, but they turn into dead ends; the result is disappointingly ordinary".  Conversely, Kevin Gilvear of DVD Times praised the director and the film in comparison to Satoshi Miki's debut film In the Pool by saying "(the film) retains the kind of skewed psychological underpinnings and energy that made the former so enjoyable" and that "...thanks to a sprightly and diverse cast playing a bunch of locals with unlikely talents that we can come away with a huge smile on our face".

Release
The film was first released in Japan July 2, 2005. It was released in South Korea on October 19, 2006. It screened in the United Kingdom at the Raindance Film Festival on October 28, 2008, and in Taiwan on November 7, 2008.

References

External links
 Film website 
 Kame wa igai to hayaku oyogu at the Internet Movie Database
 Turtles Are Surprisingly Fast Swimmers at Nippon Cinema

2005 films
Japanese comedy films
2000s Japanese-language films